David Gregory Bellavia (born November 10, 1975) is a former United States Army soldier who was awarded the Medal of Honor for his actions during the Second Battle of Fallujah. Bellavia has also received the Bronze Star Medal, two Army Commendation Medals, two Army Achievement Medals, and the New York State Conspicuous Service Cross. In 2005, Bellavia was inducted into the New York Veterans' Hall of Fame. He has subsequently been involved with politics in Western New York State. Upon being awarded the Medal of Honor on June 25, 2019, Bellavia became the first, and currently only living recipient of the Medal of Honor for service during the Iraq War.

Military service
Bellavia enlisted in the United States Army in July 1999 and deployed to Iraq after serving in Kosovo.

The actions for which Bellavia earned a Silver Star Medal took place on his 29th birthday. As a member of Company A, Task Force 2-2, 1st Infantry Division, his platoon was assigned during Operation Phantom Fury to clear a block of twelve buildings from which insurgents were firing on American forces. The platoon began searching house-to-house. At the tenth house, Bellavia fatally shot an insurgent preparing to load a rocket-propelled grenade. A second insurgent fired at him, and Bellavia wounded him in the shoulder. When Staff Sergeant Bellavia entered a bedroom, the wounded insurgent followed, forcing Bellavia to kill him. When another insurgent began firing from upstairs, Bellavia returned fire and killed him. A fourth insurgent then jumped out of a closet in the bedroom, yelling and firing his weapon as he leaped over a bed trying to reach Bellavia. The insurgent tripped and Bellavia wounded him. Bellavia chased the insurgent when he ran upstairs. He followed the wounded insurgent's bloody footprints to a room on the left and threw in a fragmentation grenade. Upon entering the room, Bellavia discovered it was filled with propane tanks and plastic explosives. He did not fire his weapon for fear of setting off an explosion and instead then engaged in hand-to-hand combat with the insurgent, which led to Bellavia killing the insurgent by stabbing him in the collarbone.

Bellavia's actions in Fallujah were first documented in the November 22, 2004 Time magazine cover story, "Into the Hot Zone", by journalist Michael Ware, who was attached with Bellavia's unit during the fight. Partial video capturing the event can be seen in Michael Ware's documentary Only The Dead.

After serving for six years, Bellavia left the service with the rank of staff sergeant in 2005.

On June 7, 2019, It was revealed to the media that Bellavia's Silver Star would be upgraded to the Medal of Honor. Bellavia was awarded the Silver Star for actions clearing houses during the Second Battle of Fallujah in November 2004. The Medal of Honor awarding ceremony took place at the White House on June 25, 2019, and was awarded to Bellavia by President Donald Trump. The ceremony was also attended by former members of Bellavia's platoon in Iraq.

Awards and decorations

Medal of Honor citation

Legacy and media 
When Bellavia's Silver Star was upgraded to the Medal of Honor in 2019, he became the first living recipient to have a recorded Medal of Honor action. He is also only the second recipient to have their Medal of Honor action filmed, with the first being John A. Chapman who was posthumously awarded the Medal of Honor for his actions in Afghanistan in 2002. At the time of the action, Bellavia's Platoon was accompanied by Australian journalist Michael Ware who filmed the action from a downstairs doorway. Ware, who worked for Time and CNN at the time, wrote about the action for the cover story of the November 2004 edition of Time Magazine. It is unclear if the footage aired on CNN at the time, but it is prominently featured in Michael Ware's 2015 documentary Only The Dead.

A re-enactment of Bellavia's action is also depicted in season 2 episode 10 of The History Channel TV show Shootout!. However this aired in 2006, long before he was awarded the MoH so it is not mentioned in the episode.

Subsequent career
Bellavia was Vice Chairman and co-founder of Vets for Freedom. He attended the 2006 State of the Union address as an honored guest. He currently is President of EMPact America, an American energy resiliency organization based in Elma, New York.

In 2007, Bellavia published a memoir, House to House: An Epic Memoir of War, co-written with John R. Bruning. In September 2010, the book was chosen as one of the top five best Iraq War memoirs by journalist Thomas Ricks (author of Fiasco). In 2012, Bellavia signed an agreement with 2012 Oscar-winning producer Rich Middlemas to make his memoir into a major motion picture.

Since leaving the United States Army, Bellavia has twice run for congress in New York's 26th congressional district. In 2008, he ran in the Republican primary to succeed retiring representative Tom Reynolds. Bellavia dropped out of the race before the Republican Party ballot was finalized and endorsed Republican Chris Lee, who went on to win the seat.

When Lee resigned from office in 2011, Bellavia again tried for the seat in the special election. State party officials endorsed State Assemblywoman Jane Corwin, so Bellavia launched an unsuccessful third-party bid, forming the "Federalist Party of New York" with political operatives that had previously been involved in the short-lived Taxpayers Party. The New York State Tea Party announced their displeasure with the Republican party's choice of Corwin, and hinted that they might back Bellavia's run, but the ruling of State Board of Elections that Bellavia's petition to be placed on the ballot was deficient ended his 2011 run. Bellavia, in turn, endorsed perennial candidate Jack Davis, who likewise had been spurned by the Republicans during the endorsement process and was running on a third-party candidacy backed by a competing Tea Party faction.

Bellavia was a candidate in the 2012 Republican primary for the since-renumbered 27th congressional district of New York. Bellavia competed against Chris Collins, the former county executive of Erie County, for the Republican nomination. Buoyed by the endorsements of four of the five GOP county committees that endorsed, Bellavia and Collins faced off in a June 26, 2012 primary. Collins won both the primary and the general election even though Bellavia won six of NY 27th Congressional District's eight counties.

Bellavia joined the staff of WBEN in late 2012 as a fill-in host and became the station's permanent late-night host in October 2013. Bellavia left the show on November 4, 2013. Bellavia co-hosted afternoons with Tom Bauerle from 2016 to 2019. He returned to WBEN in August 2020 as 9-to-noon host, succeeding Sandy Beach, who retired after 23 years with the station. Currently, Bellavia is working on his second book. He resides in western New York.

On August 11, 2018, Bellavia announced his candidacy for New York's 27th congressional district. The incumbent, Christopher Collins, had suspended his reelection campaign just hours earlier amidst federal indictments for insider trading and wire fraud. Bellavia withdrew from the race on August 21 after interviews, stating that he feared the electoral process would be corrupted by a court.

Personal life
He has three children. He is the youngest of four sons born to the late Dr. William Bellavia and Marilyn Brunacini.

References

External links

 Staff Sgt. David G Bellavia Hall of Heroes Induction Speech
 Army.mil profile
 Interview on House to House at the Pritzker Military Museum & Library on March 19, 2009
 

1975 births
United States Army personnel of the Iraq War
Iraq War recipients of the Medal of Honor
Living people
Military personnel from Buffalo, New York
New York (state) Republicans
United States Army Medal of Honor recipients
United States Army soldiers
Candidates in the 2018 United States elections